Floribella is a video game released by Move Interactive in partnership with SIC, based on the Portuguese TV series Floribella. The game was released after the end of the second season of the show.

External links
Official website 

2007 video games
Europe-exclusive video games
Video games based on television series
Video games developed in Portugal
Windows games
Windows-only games